Fernando Martín Perezlindo  (born 3 January 1977 in Santa Fe, Argentina) is an Argentine footballer who is currently playing for Chacarita Juniors.

External links
 Statistics at FutbolXXI.com 

1977 births
Living people
Argentine footballers
Argentine expatriate footballers
Unión de Santa Fe footballers
Racing Club de Avellaneda footballers
C.A. Bella Vista players
Millonarios F.C. players
Tiro Federal footballers
Crucero del Norte footballers
Chacarita Juniors footballers
C.D. ESPOLI footballers
Argentine Primera División players
Categoría Primera A players
Expatriate footballers in Colombia
Expatriate footballers in Ecuador
Expatriate footballers in Uruguay
Argentina under-20 international footballers
Argentina youth international footballers
Footballers from Santa Fe, Argentina
Association football forwards